Shahrak-e Vali-ye Asr (also Romanized as Shahrak-e Valī-ye ‘Aşr) is a village in Rostaq Rural District, Rostaq District, Darab County, Fars Province, Iran. At the 2006 census, its population was 1,769, in 463 families.

References 

Populated places in Darab County